Impax Environmental Markets is an investment trust focused on environmental companies in North America, Europe and Asia was launched in 2002. It is listed on the London Stock Exchange and is a constituent of the FTSE 250 Index. The chairman is John Scott.

References

External links
  Official site

Financial services companies established in 2002
Investment trusts of the United Kingdom
Companies listed on the London Stock Exchange